Andriy Serdinov (born 17 November 1982) is a Ukrainian swimmer, who competed in the 2000 Olympics, 2004 Olympics and the 2008 Olympics.  Serdinov also won the bronze medal in the 100 m butterfly at the 2004 Summer Olympics.

Serdinov was also the world record holder in this event, which stood for approximately five minutes. He broke Michael Klim's mark during the semifinals of the World Championships in Barcelona, Spain, in 2003, only to have Michael Phelps break it in the next semifinal. It was later again broken by Ian Crocker in the final, the day after.

In 2003 he won two golds at the Summer Universiade, in the 50 m and 100 m butterfly.

References
 

1982 births
Living people
Sportspeople from Luhansk
Ukrainian male freestyle swimmers
Ukrainian male butterfly swimmers
Olympic swimmers of Ukraine
Olympic bronze medalists for Ukraine
Swimmers at the 2000 Summer Olympics
Swimmers at the 2004 Summer Olympics
Swimmers at the 2008 Summer Olympics
World record setters in swimming
Olympic bronze medalists in swimming
World Aquatics Championships medalists in swimming
Medalists at the FINA World Swimming Championships (25 m)
European Aquatics Championships medalists in swimming
Medalists at the 2004 Summer Olympics
Universiade medalists in swimming
Universiade gold medalists for Ukraine
Universiade silver medalists for Ukraine
Medalists at the 2001 Summer Universiade
Medalists at the 2003 Summer Universiade
21st-century Ukrainian people